Borao Ka Khera is a village in Udaipur district in the Indian state of Rajasthan. It is administrated by Sarpanch (Head of Village) who is elected representative of village. It is located on hilly area above 540 meters above the sea level.

References

Villages in Udaipur district